Param Singh may refer to:

Param Singh (actor) (born 1988), Indian actor
Param Singh (entrepreneur) (active from 2011), British entrepreneur and community activist